Guoguo (born October 1967) is a Chinese politician of Tibetan ethnicity, currently serving as mayor of Lhasa.

He is a delegate to the 13th National People's Congress.

Early life and education
Guoguo was born in Maizhokunggar County, Tibet Autonomous Region, in October 1967.

Political career
Guoguo worked as a secretary in the government of Maizhokunggar County in May 1984. In September 1987, he was assigned to the Organization Department of the CCP Maizhokunggar County Committee, where he eventually becoming deputy head in August 1993. In October 1995, he was appointed deputy secretary of the Lhasa Municipal Committee of the Communist Youth League of China, but having held the position for only two years. In October 1997, he became deputy director of Lhasa Municipal Cultural Bureau, rising to director in March 2005. He was deputy party secretary of Nyêmo County in October 2007, in addition to serving as magistrate. He served as vice mayor of Lhasa in December 2010, and in October 2016 was promoted to the mayor position. He also served as party secretary of Chengguan District from August 2013 to September 2020.

References

1967 births
Living people
People from Lhasa
Tibet University alumni
Central Party School of the Chinese Communist Party alumni
People's Republic of China politicians from Tibet
Chinese Communist Party politicians from Tibet
Delegates to the 13th National People's Congress